The Agricultural Wages Act 1948 (c 47) was a UK Act of Parliament under which the Agricultural Wages Board regulated the amount that farm workers were paid, in order to guarantee a fair minimum wage scale, depending, for example, on type of work, or years of experience. After the National Minimum Wage Act 1998 was introduced, agricultural wages tended to be slightly higher than those at the minimum. However, the Conservative-Liberal-Democrat coalition government decided to allow farm worker wages to be reduced by repealing most of the 1948 Act in the Enterprise and Regulatory Reform Act 2013. This did not affect Scotland.

Background
Agriculture Act 1920
Agricultural Wages (Regulation) Act 1924
Minister of Food (United Kingdom)

See also
Scottish Agricultural Wages Board
Agricultural Wages (Scotland) Act 1949

United Kingdom labour law
United Kingdom Acts of Parliament 1948
1948 in labor relations
Agriculture legislation in the United Kingdom